Sonia Scurfield, (née Onishenko; September 19, 1928 – June 14, 2018) was a Canadian philanthropist. She was the co-owner of the Calgary Flames hockey team from 1985 to 1994. She became the second woman, and the only Canadian woman, to have her name engraved on the Stanley Cup when the Flames won the National Hockey League championship in 1989.

Early life and education
Sonia Scurfield was born on September 19, 1928 to Ukrainian/Russian immigrant parents, John Onishenko and  Motia (Stupka) Onishenko. She was educated at the University of Saskatchewan, graduating in 1949 with a Bachelor of Arts as a lab technician. Afterward, she completed one year at the University of Manitoba where she earned a Bachelor of Social Work.

Career
She married Ralph T. Scurfield, on July 24, 1954, in Edmonton, Alberta. Together they raised seven children in Calgary, Alberta.  Ralph Scurfield was part of the original consortium that bought the Atlanta Flames in 1980 and moved them to Calgary, and Scurfield inherited his interest upon his death.

References

1928 births
2018 deaths
Businesspeople from Saskatchewan
Calgary Flames owners
Canadian sports businesspeople
Canadian people of Russian descent
Canadian people of Ukrainian descent
Canadian women in business
Ice hockey in Calgary
National Hockey League owners
Ice hockey people from Calgary
Stanley Cup champions
University of Saskatchewan alumni